Cortana may refer to:

Cortana (gastropod), a gastropod genus
Cortana (Halo), character in the Halo franchise
Cortana (virtual assistant), virtual assistant from Microsoft
Cortana, or Curtana, a ceremonial sword used in the coronation of British monarchs
Cortain, or Curtana, the sword wielded by Ogier the Dane, Paladin of Charlemagne